Yang Bin (born 3 October 1991) is a Chinese footballer currently playing as a midfielder for Meizhou Hakka.

Career statistics

Club
.

References

1991 births
Living people
Chinese footballers
Association football midfielders
China League One players
China League Two players
Guangzhou F.C. players
Meizhou Hakka F.C. players